Moscow Theological Academy is a higher educational institution of the Russian Orthodox Church, training clergy, teachers, scholars, and officials.

The Academy traces its origin to the Slavic Greek Latin Academy, which was founded in 1685 by the Greek Lichud brothers. It was reorganized in 1814 and moved from Moscow to the Trinity Lavra of St. Sergius  in the town of Sergiyev Posad, Moscow Oblast.  The academy was closed in 1919, and reopened in 1944.

History

Academy at Trinity-Sergius Lavra (1814-1917) 
In 1814, the Moscow Slavic Greek Latin Academy moved from Moscow to the Trinity-Sergius Lavra. The grand opening of the Academy in the Lavra took place on October 1, 1814 — the day of the Feast of the Intercession of the Theotokos. Now it has become known as the Moscow Theological Academy. About a third of the first-year staff of the new school were formed by pupils of the old Academy and Trinity Theological Seminary. Archimandrite Simeon (Krylov-Platonov), who had been rector of the Slavic-Greek-Latin Academy since 1810, was confirmed as rector of the transformed school.

The Moscow Theological Academy itself emphasizes continuity with the Slavic-Greek-Latin Academy; the 1814 transferring considered as reorganization of the Academy in order to improve and expand spiritual education. Speaking about the 50th anniversary of the Academy's relocation to the Lavra, the famous poet and playwright of the XIX century Nikolay Sushkov remarked: "The day of October 1, in fact, can be called a holiday of renewal, since the Moscow Slavic-Greek-Latin Academy, which lived 130 years before its transfer to the Lavra, was transformed in it and updated… Thus, it is not 50, but 180 years old". Academician of the St. Petersburg Imperial Academy of Sciences, professor of the Moscow Theological Academy Yevgeny Golubinsky pointed out that "the Moscow Theological Academy is the former Moscow Slavic-Greek-Latin Academy". After all, the Academy of the second half of the XVIII century was the brainchild of Metropolitan Platon (Levshin). At the origins of the Lavra Academy were also the closest disciples and associates of the famous Moscow saint — Metropolitan Eugene (Bolkhovitinov) and Archbishop Augustine (Vinogradsky), and the Trinity Academy also received its face and main direction thanks to Metropolitan Platon's disciple, Metropolitan Philaret (Drozdov).

The new curriculum, according to the charter of 1814, was introduced gradually. The training at the Academy consisted of two two-year courses. At the opening of classes in 1814, the following subjects were read: interpretation of the Holy Scriptures, philosophy, world literature, general civil history, mathematics, languages: Hebrew, Greek, German, French and English. In 1816, lecturing of dogmatic theology was began, since 1817 moral theology and comparative theology added. The program also included other subjects: pastoral theology, church eloquence, church history, canon law (since 1840), patristics (since 1841), metaphysics (since 1842), history of philosophy (since 1843), biblical history, Russian civil history, church archaeology (since 1844). In this form, the program lasted until 1869. Special importance was attached to the study of ancient languages: Greek and Latin, in the study of which students achieved considerable success. According to the testimony of the historian of the Moscow Academy, Archpriest Sergei Konstantinovich Smirnov, "Students were assigned to translate entire books from fathers' works".

Metropolitan Philaret attached great importance to the divine service in the spiritual education of students. From 1835 to 1841, the position of rector was held by an outstanding scientist and church leader Archimandrite Philaret (Gumilyevsky), later Archbishop of Chernigov, who was canonized by the Ukrainian Orthodox Church of the Moscow Patriarchate in 2009. It was Archbishop Philaret who initiated the publication of the works of the Holy Fathers at the Moscow Theological Academy. However, the results of translation efforts came at the time of the next rector. In January 1842, Metropolitan Philaret (Drozdov) was presented with the first translations of the works of St. Gregory the Theologian, edited by the famous worker of science Archpriest Peter Delitsin. At the same time, the press organ of the Academy was created — "Additions to the works of the Holy Fathers". This undertaking was extremely important. Continuous connection with the patristic tradition is an indispensable condition for the development of Orthodox theology and spiritual life. Having begun systematic publishing activity with a series of patristic works, the Academy embarked on the path of revival of Orthodox theology. The "Additions" published articles of church-historical and theological content. This is the first scientific journal of the Academy, in fact, the "Theological Bulletin" in the initial stage of its existence.

The Moscow Theological Academy also took part in the translation of the Bible into Russian, but here its role cannot be called paramount. The main work was done in St. Petersburg. The Moscow Academy translated Exodus and Deuteronomy from the Hebrew. The Gospel of Mark and the Epistles of the Holy Apostle Paul to the Romans and Galatians were translated from the books of the New Testament at the Academy, as well as a revision and verification of the entire Fourth Gospel and the Acts of the Apostles, translated by other academies.

Under the next rector, Archimandrite Eusebius (Orlinsky), who headed the Academy from 1841 to 1847, a high spiritual and scientific atmosphere was maintained. In 1842 Metropolitan Philaret wrote to the Synod: "The main subject of academic teaching, dogmatic theology, was taught and accepted in the spirit of Orthodoxy, with thoroughness and strength".

Of the subsequent rectors, we should mention Archimandrite Sergius (Lyapidevsky) (1820-1898), the future Metropolitan of Moscow, who was also a pupil of the Academy and managed it as rector from 1857 to 1861. Archimandrite Sergius enjoyed the support and respect of Metropolitan Philaret. With him in 1857 The Academy was visited by an outstanding spiritual writer of the XIX century, Ignatius (Bryanchaninov).

In 1861-1862 Archimandrite Sabbas (Tikhomirov) was rector of the Academy, later Archbishop of Tver and Kashin. He is known for his church-archaeological and paleographic research and his multi—volume autobiography "Chronicle of My Life" - a valuable source for the history of Russian church life and, in particular, the Moscow Theological Academy in the second half of the XIX century. His unique library was added to the library of the Moscow Theological Academy at the end of the XIX century.

The most outstanding rector of the Academy in the second half of the XIX century. there was a church historian and theologian, Professor Archpriest Alexander Gorsky. He was nurtured by the Academy and later devoted all his strength and talents to it. The years of his rectorship, 1862-1875, became one of the most scientifically striking periods in the history of the Moscow Theological Academy. During the rectorship of Archpriest Alexander Gorsky, the charter of 1869 came into effect, which established the Academy Council headed by the rector as the highest body. According to the new charter, the Academy had to solve the most important issues at general meetings, the whole corporation elected a new teacher. The Charter expanded the opportunities for admission to Academies, now not only seminarians, but also high school students were to be accepted, and the admission of free students was also allowed. It is allowed to publish lectures, establish scientific societies. Academies have acquired the right of their own censorship. Of great importance was the introduction of a mandatory doctorate for the rector and for professors. This contributed to the revival of scientific activity. The Charter of 1869 generally met the requirements of its time and helped Archpriest Alexander Gorsky to expediently direct the life of the Academy. Under Gorsky leadership, with the fervent support of Metropolitan Innocent (Veniaminov) of Moscow, a church was built in the academic assembly hall in the building of the Royal Palaces, consecrated on February 12, 1870 in honor of the Intercession of the Most Holy Theotokos. Following the church, Archpriest Alexander Gorsky achieved the creation of an academic cemetery on the territory of the Academy garden. From now on, the mentors who departed to another world did not part with their native Academy even after death.

Among the successors of Archpriest Alexader Gorsky, Professor Archpriest Sergei Smirnov (1818-1889), a well-known Hellenist and historian of the Academy, stands out in particular. Having served as a professor for 35 years, Sergei Smirnov in 1878 was appointed by the Decree of the Most Holy Synod to the post of rector of the Academy and as a result of this appointment, already in old age, accepted the priesthood. His "History of the Moscow Slavic-Greek-Latin Academy" (Moscow, 1855), "History of the Trinity Lavra Seminary" (Moscow, 1867) and "History of the Moscow Theological Academy before its transformation (1814-1870)" (Moscow, 1879) are extremely rich in the materials used in them, comprehensively illuminating the life of the Academy and seminary. They are based on the richest academic archive, which at that time was naturally stored in the Academy itself.

In 1884, a new charter of theological academies was introduced, which began to differ in "multi-subject, which, however, did not make students more educated ...". The change in the academic charter just fifteen years after the introduction of the previous charter suggests that at that time there was an active search for the form and scope of teaching that most corresponded to the changing requirements of the time. New trends in the life of the Academy were introduced by the rector Archimandrite Anthony (Khrapovitsky) (1890-1895), formerly the rector of the St. Petersburg Theological Seminary. Under Archimandrite Anthony, in 1892, the publication of "Additions to the Works of the Holy Fathers" continued under the new name "Theological Bulletin" (Богословский вестник), which soon turned into one of the best theological journals. Patristic creations have now been published as appendices to the new magazine.

On March 13, 1898, Archimandrite Arsenius (Stadnitsky), who had been an inspector at the Academy since 1897 and held the position of ordinary professor at the Department of Biblical History, was appointed rector. On February 28, 1899, he was consecrated as titular bishop of Volokolamsk, vicar of the Moscow diocese, leaving the post of rector of the Academy. Since that time, the Academy has been regularly headed by a rector in the episcopal rank. Since 1909 The Academy was headed by Theodore (Pozdeevsky), Bishop of Volokolamsk, vicar of the Moscow diocese. In the late XIX — early XX centuries, the issue of a new reform of theological schools was discussed in church circles. Back in 1897, the extraordinary professor of the St. Petersburg Theological Academy, Nikolay Glubokovsky, noted "the weakening of the theological and scientific activity of academic pupils." The reform of church education was also discussed in 1906 at the Pre-Council Presence. After an active discussion, the Most Holy Synod worked out a new statute, adopted in 1910 and supplemented in 1912.

From July 7 to July 14, 1917, with the blessing of the Most Holy Synod, under the chairmanship of Archbishop Tikhon (Bellavin) of Moscow and Kolomna, the All-Russian Congress of Learned Monasticism gathered at the Academy, which strongly opposed the reform of academies on the basis of autonomy. In September 1917, for the first time in the history of the Academy, the election of the rector took place. Anatoly Petrovich Orlov, professor of the Department of History and Denunciation of Western Confessions, was elected rector. A month later, the newly elected rector was ordained a priest and elevated to the rank of archpriest.

The last remarkable event of academic life was the celebration of the 50th anniversary of the death of Metropolitan Philaret (Drozdov), which took place on November 18 and 19, 1917. These days, Metropolitan Tikhon of Moscow, who was named Patriarch on November 5, and members of the Local Council were present at the Academy.

Soviet era 
With the establishment of Soviet power, the conditions of the Academy's activities changed. The decree of January 23, 1918 On separation of Church from State and school from Church prohibited "the teaching of religious doctrines in all state and public, as well as private educational institutions," but the decree of the People's Commissariat of Justice of August 24 of the same year allowed the teaching of religious doctrines in "specially theological" institutions. In 1918, the last set of applicants was held at the Moscow Theological Academy. On August 22, the lectures began. On October 1, the annual act took place, which was attended by Patriarch Tikhon, who celebrated the liturgy in the Academic Church of The Intercession of the Most Holy Theotokos on the same day. The academic year was difficult, there were only four classrooms at the disposal of the Academy, the number of students was significantly reduced. Serious problems with the financing of the Academy began. March 2, 1919 The Board of the Academy adopted a resolution on the termination of the "Theological Bulletin" due to the inability to continue its publication. In the spring of 1919, after the fifth week of Lent, the school year was completed ahead of schedule. The reason for this was the lack of funding and the seizure of academic buildings by the state. After the final closure of the Academy, which continued its activity at the temples of Moscow until the end of the 1920s, a particularly dramatic period came, culminating in the withdrawal of all books, archives and manuscripts from the Academy's book depositories to the vaults or funds of the Lenin Library in the 1930s.

On September 4, 1943, the Kremlin hosted a historic meeting of the Chairman of the Government of the USSR, Joseph Stalin, with the hierarchs of the Russian Orthodox Church — Patriarchal Locum Tenens Metropolitan Sergius (Stragorodsky), Metropolitan Alexy (Simansky) of Leningrad and Metropolitan Nicholas (Yarushevich) of Kiev and Galicia. One of the most important results of this meeting was an agreement on the revival of spiritual education for the training of clergy.

Shortly after this meeting, Archbishop Gregory (Chukov) of Saratov, on behalf of Patriarch Sergius, developed a project for the organization of an Orthodox Theological Institute in Moscow and theological and pastoral schools in diocesan centers. It was approved by the Holy Synod in the second half of October 1943, and on November 28, 1943, the Council of People's Commissars adopted Resolution on these institutions in Moscow. It was assumed that the curriculum at the Institute would be three-year, and at the courses two-year.

The Vice-rector (Проректор) of the Institute and Courses from December 1, 1943 was appointed Master of theology Sergey Vasilyevich Savinsky, a graduate of the Kiev Theological Academy, who after the revolution worked in Soviet institutions and for some time was in the Renovationist schism. Savinsky immediately began preparing the premises allocated for study and residence of students in the Novodevichy Convent — the so-called "Lopukhinsky building" with the gate church of the Transfiguration of the Lord.

On June 14, 1944, the grand opening of the Orthodox Theological Institute and Theological and Pastoral courses took place. Metropolitan Alexy (Simansky) of Leningrad, who headed the Russian Church as Patriarch Locum Tenens after the death of Patriarch Sergius, said a word on this day in which he noted: "Those who enter our theological educational schools do not enter them involuntarily, but following their desire to serve the Holy Church in holy orders. The whole structure of these schools should be strictly ecclesiastical, without any deviation towards the mundane, secular way of life." On August 28, 1944, the Holy Synod appointed Archpriest Tikhon Dmitrievich Popov, a graduate of the Kiev Theological Academy (1896-1900), as rector. Fr. Tikhon supervised the repair and restoration work in the Lopukhinsky building and in the Transfiguration Church of the Novodevichy Convent, and also delved into any details of the educational process. At the first recruitment, 17 and 19 people were enrolled in the Institute and Courses, respectively.

On December 29, 1945, after intensive restoration work, the Assumption Church was solemnly consecrated, in the storerooms of which the student dormitory was located. Meals for teachers and students were provided in the Refectory. Metropolitan Pitirim (Nechayev) in his memoirs described an interesting feature from the life of the students of that time: "They had breakfast and lunch at the same tables at which the lessons were held".

1944-1946 were the most interesting from the point of view of the history of the initial steps of the revival of spiritual education. On the wave of popular enthusiasm associated with the victorious end of the Second World War, it seemed that the newly opened theological schools were opening up huge prospects in the field of the revival of spiritual education. The teachers sincerely hoped that the state would not prevent the publication of scientific and theological periodicals and monographs. At that time, the teaching staff of the Institute and Courses, small but cohesive, tried to promptly solve any educational, administrative and economic tasks.

The decree of the Council of Ministers of the USSR of May 29, 1946 authorized the opening of theological academies in Moscow, Leningrad and Kiev, and the decree of July 9, 1946 opened the possibility of converting theological and pastoral courses in Moscow, Leningrad, Kiev, Saratov, Lviv, Odessa, Minsk, Lutsk, Stavropol into theological seminaries. In accordance with this decision, the Moscow Orthodox Theological Institute was transformed into the Moscow Theological Academy with a four-year course of study. The third and forth courses of the Institute became the first and second courses of the Academy, and the preparatory courses and the first two courses of the Institute became a Seminary with a four-year program. Administratively, the Academy and the Seminary were united — for the first time in the history of the Academy — and this association became a characteristic feature of the entire subsequent era. The two-pronged theological school became officially called "Moscow Theological Academy and Seminary".

In October 1948 the Moscow Theological Academy and Seminary returned to the Trinity-Sergius Lavra. October 14, 1948, the official Government Commission accepted the restoration work of the buildings transferred to the Academy on December 10, 1947, which included: the rector's building — traditionally called "halls" (чертоги), the metropolitan building, the gate church of St. John the Baptist and several rooms in the eastern wall adjacent to the Holy Gate. The new academic year began on the historical territory on October 15. The classrooms and dormitories of the students were housed in the renovated building of the Royal Palaces. Evening services were held there, in the assembly hall, before the revival of the Intercession Academic Church, and teachers and students went to the Lavra churches for the Liturgy. In 1951, on the initiative of Hieromonk Sergius (Golubtsov) a Church Archaeological Cabinet was formed.

At the end of 1954, the Zagorsky City Palace was evicted from the territory of the Academy, the cinema hall of which was arranged in the former Intercession Church. The historical premises of the church in a very neglected state were restored in a few months. May 21, 1955 Patriarch Alexy I of Moscow and All Russia performed the solemn consecration of the church, which became a bright and memorable event for theological schools. Work on the reconstruction and beautification of the church continued over the following years. In October 1955 The Academy was given the Bachelor's and two—thirds of the Inspector's Building (later the First Lavra Hotel), and in 1956 - the Library Building, which previously housed the Pedagogical Institute. Thus, by 1957, All historical buildings confiscated by the Soviet government were returned to the Academy. During this period, the Soviet government was prohibited from publishing textbooks and teaching general education subjects that directly affect the formation of a worldview — psychology, logic, the history of philosophy and literature. In that era, the teaching of classical languages in the Seminary was reduced to an almost useless minimum.

In 1969, a regent class was formed at the Academy, which was transformed into a Regent School in 1985. At that time it was the only possible form of women's religious education.

A great disaster for the Moscow Theological Academy and Seminary was a fire on the night of September 27-28, 1986. Five seminary students died in the fire, a student dormitory with an assembly hall adjacent to it burned down, and the Intercession Academic Church was damaged. The building of the former monastery hospital-almshouse with the church of St. John of the Ladder, in which the Zagorsk City Hospital was located in Soviet times, was transferred to the Moscow Theological Academy. After the restoration work was completed, seminar rooms and student dormitories were located in this building.

Since 1991 
In 1993, efforts were made to resume the publication of the academic journal "Theological Bulletin". In 1990s all the restrictions with which the Soviet government tried to slow down the development of theological schools and theological science were completely lifted, but new difficulties appeared, mainly related to the difficult economic situation in Russia and with limited funding for theological education. Despite all the difficulties, in 1991 the renovation of the church of St. John of the Ladder was completed, and after the minor consecration regular services began in it. In 1994, the great consecration of the church was performed by Patriarch Alexy II of Moscow and all Russia.

On July 18, 1995, Bishop Eugene (Reshetnikov) was appointed rector of the Moscow Theological Academy and Seminary. In order to activate the process of reforming the system of theological education in the Russian Orthodox Church, the position of rector was combined with the position of Chairman of the Educational Committee at the Holy Synod. Under Bishop Eugene, the life of the Moscow Theological Academy and Seminary became much more lively. He granted creative freedom for the initiatives of a number of initiative teachers both in the field of teaching and in the implementation of a number of publishing and spiritual and educational projects. The Academy had its own small publishing house, which for several years was headed by hieromonk Euthymius (Moiseyev). A number of Cabinets were created: Greek, Pedagogical, Biblical, which initially took over part of the work to improve information support and the quality of teaching in the relevant fields. Thanks to the efforts of a group of teachers, a language reform was carried out on the basis of the Greek Cabinet, thanks to which the teaching of classical languages was restored in the Seminary and then in the Academy, although not in full. Also, a full-fledged revival of the journal "Theological Bulletin" took place during the period from 2003 to the present, when several thousand pages with articles, translations and publications were published. If in the previous era a student's business trip abroad was a special exception, then since 2000 language courses and study abroad have become a real opportunity for talented students.

Back in 1994, the Bishops' Council decided to prepare by 2000 a program for the transition to a system of theological education, within which seminaries should become higher schools that train clergymen, while academies should be transformed into research centers that provide theological specialization. On the basis of the Council's definition, a working group was created to develop in detail the concept of a new system of theological education. Proposals were developed to reform the system of theological education, which, with clarifications, were approved by the Holy Synod on December 27, 1996. The developed program of reform of theological schools contained a transition to a five-year course of education in the seminary. Starting from the 2003/2004 academic year, the Academy's curricula began to be built taking into account future specialization. In this regard, four directions of teaching were created at the Academy: biblical, theological, church-historical, church-practical. The activity of the academic departments has significantly intensified.

After the 200th anniversary of the Academy's stay in the Lavra, there was a certain lull in her life, necessary for solving deep internal problems. The Academic Corporation had to prepare for state accreditation, which opened up fundamentally new prospects for the Academy. On December 8, 2016, the head of Rosobrnadzor Sergey Kravtsov signed Order No. 2072 on state accreditation of educational activities of a religious organization — a theological educational organization of higher education "Moscow Theological Academy of the Russian Orthodox Church". However, the accreditation process did not end there. In fact, the bachelor's degree of the Moscow Theological Academy received accreditation, and the master's degree had to go this way in the near future. On June 13, 2018, the head of Rosobrnadzor Sergey Kravtsov signed Order No. 802 "On the Reissue of the certificate of state accreditation of a Religious organization — the theological educational organization of higher Education "Moscow Theological Academy of the Russian Orthodox Church"".

Rectors

External links
 

1687 establishments in Russia
Educational institutions disestablished in 1919
1946 establishments in Russia
Educational institutions established in 1946
Christian organizations established in 1946
Moscow Theological Academy